Leonidas Skoutaris (born 28 August 1976 in Athens, Greece), is a retired Greek professional basketball player.

College career
Skoutaris played college basketball at Cleveland State, with the Cleveland State Vikings.

Professional career
On 12 September 1996, Skoutaris won the FIBA Intercontinental Cup championship while playing for Panathinaikos. In the 3rd game of the Intercontinental Cup between Panathinaikos and Olympia Tuerto, Skoutaris scored 3 points.

He also played for Ilysiakos  and Panerythraikos.

References

External links 
FIBA Europe Profile
Eurobasket.com Profile
Sports-Reference.com Profile

1976 births
Greek men's basketball players
Greek Basket League players
Panathinaikos B.C. players
Small forwards
Living people
Ilysiakos B.C. players
Palaio Faliro B.C. players
Sporting basketball players
Near East B.C. players
Peristeri B.C. players
Cleveland State Vikings men's basketball players
Basketball players from Athens